Witness is a literary and issue-oriented magazine published by the Black Mountain Institute at UNLV.  Each issue includes fiction, poetry, memoir, and literary essays. The magazine has been honored with ten grants from the National Endowment for the Arts, and writings from the journal have been recognized in The Best American Essays, The O. Henry Prize Stories, The Best American Poetry, and The Pushcart Prize.

Launched in Detroit in 1987, Witness has published 43 issues, twenty of them focused on topics of contemporary interest. The magazine is best known for showcasing work that defines its historical moment.  Special issues have focused on political oppression, religion, the natural world, crime, aging, civil rights, love, ethnic America, and, most recently, exile. The issues "New Nature Writing," "The Sixties," "Sports in America," and "The Best of Witness, 1987 - 2004" eventually appeared as university press anthologies.  In 2007, Witness moved from Oakland Community College to Black Mountain Institute at the University of Nevada, Las Vegas.

See also
List of literary magazines

References

External links
Witness homepage

Literary magazines published in the United States
Magazines established in 1987
Triannual magazines published in the United States
University of Nevada, Las Vegas
Magazines published in Detroit
Magazines published in Nevada